Jorge Ben à l'Olympia is a 1975 live album by Brazilian artist Jorge Ben recorded at Olympia.

Track listing
All tracks written by Jorge Ben

 "Bebete vãobora" - 4:15
 "Zazueira" - 5:25
 "Por causa de você menina" - 4:38
 "Taj Mahal" - 6:20
 "Os alquimistas estão chegando os alquimistas" - 4:20
 "Fio Maravilha" - 4:12
 "Luciana [Para ouvir no rádio]" - 6:25
 "Caramba!" - 7:22

References

1975 live albums
Jorge Ben albums
Albums recorded at the Olympia (Paris)